The Tall Pines Inn is a historic log cabin resort located at the junction of Pivot Rock Road and United States Route 62 in Eureka Springs, Arkansas. Established in 1947, it features six rustic cabins built from surrounding forests and modernized to meet the needs of today's traveler.  Besides these cabins, which are of log construction, the inn has three suites which are part of the original log residence (formerly occupied by the innkeeper), twelve other cabins/suites with wood siding,  and a swimming pool.

The Innkeeper's house and the six original log cabins were listed on the National Register of Historic Places in 1999, as an excellent local example of Rustic architecture.

See also
 
 
National Register of Historic Places listings in Carroll County, Arkansas

References

External links
 Tall Pines Website

Hotel buildings on the National Register of Historic Places in Arkansas
Hotels established in 1947
1947 establishments in Arkansas
National Register of Historic Places in Carroll County, Arkansas
Buildings and structures in Eureka Springs, Arkansas